Michael Frost may refer to:
 Michael Frost (minister) (born 1961), Australian missiologist and author
 Michael Frost (footballer) (born 1970), former Australian rules footballer
 Michael Frost, bass player for the Israeli alternative rock group Metropolin
 Mike Frost (cricketer), Irish cricketer

See also 
 Frost (surname)